President's College - Minuwangoda  (also known as Janadipathi Vidyalaya - Minuwangoda and formerly known as Japalawaththa Central College) is a public college in Sri Lanka, founded on February 9, 1979 in Minuwangoda, Sri Lanka by Bennet Gunasekera (member of Parliament for Minuwangoda).

The first students were admitted in 1979. There were 225 students (115 students from Minuwangoda Nalanda (Boys') Central College and 110 students selected by use of an entrance exam). Including the Principal, there were 6 teachers at the time the college started.

The college was upgraded to a 1A mix school on 1 September 1979.  The students first sat for the G.C.E Ordinary Level Exam in 1983.

Admission policy 

President’s College conducts classes from Year 6 to Year 13 and usually admits 200 pupils into Year 6. To be able to seek admission into President’s college, students must sit a Year 5 National Scholarship exam (similar to SAT/Grammar Schools exams in the UK) conducted by the Department of Education of Sri Lanka and score marks at a cut-off level or above. The College has a strict admission policy which allow only pupils who score higher marks at the National Scholarship exams to enter into Year 6. As 0f 2014 there were about 1,900 pupils studying at the school.

Administration 

The school is managed by a Principal (Chief Executive Officer) with the assistance of two Deputy Principals, Assistant Principals, Year Group Leaders, 80 teaching staff, non-academic Staff, the School Development Board and Working Committee members of the Past Pupils Association. It is state owned and funded by the national government and provincial council.

External links 

Schools in Gampaha District
Provincial schools in Sri Lanka